The St Fergus Gas Terminal is a large gas terminal found near St Fergus, Aberdeenshire, Scotland. The other main UK gas terminals are at Bacton, Norfolk and the Easington, East Riding of Yorkshire.

History
The plant was initially developed by British Gas (now National Grid) and Total Oil Marine. The three main plants have three main pipelines each coming ashore. The National Grid plant receives gas from the other main three plants. In total, St Fergus receives around 25% of the UK's gas.  The land was purchased from the historical Mess family of St. Fergus

Total
The Total part of the refinery opened in September 1977 for the Frigg pipeline, with another section opening in 1978 for the Vesterled pipeline. The Queen opened this plant officially on May 9, 1978. Vesterled is owned by the Gassled partners.

Shell
The Shell plant opened in April 1982, being officially opened by Prince Charles in October 1982, taking gas from the Brent field, via the FLAGS pipeline. Gas came from the Fulmar field in July 1987, via the Fulmar Gas Pipeline, and from the Goldeneye field in October 2004.

Apache
This plant uses the SAGE pipeline from the Brae gas field. The plant also has two other main pipelines: Atlantic, Cromarty and the Britannia pipelines.

Operation
The purpose of the receiving plants are to clean the delivered gas and present the Methane content to the adjacent British Gas plant.

National Grid
This is connected to the National Transmission System which transports to the rest of Scotland via Kirriemuir in Angus, then on to Bathgate in West Lothian.

Shell
This plant has a capacity of around 33 Mm SCM/d for the FLAGS line and 10 Mm SCM/d for the Fulmar Gas Line. It produces 23.25 Mm scu m/d of gas to the British Gas plant and exports 8,750 tonnes of liquid products to Mossmorran.

Total
This plant receives gas from twenty gas fields (including Alwyn, Miller, Bruce and most recently Rhum) and produces 20% of the UK's gas needs. It is the largest plant on the whole site. Until 1987, gas only came from the Frigg field, and production from this field finished in October 2004. Gas is transported to the TOTAL plant by the Frigg pipeline, which it owns. Total operates as Total E & P UK plc which is based in Aberdeen and is the fourth largest oil & gas operator in the North Sea.

Esso
There is also an adjacent plant operated by ExxonMobil. It receives its gas via the SAGE pipeline, which mostly follows the Miller pipeline, to the SAGE Terminal (Scottish Area Gas Evacuation). Esso operates at the plant as Mobil North Sea LLC.

Products
Ethane, Propane and heavier products are separated and sent onward to further plants located at Mossmorran, Fife (owned by Shell) and Cruden Bay (owned by BP). Separation is by a cryogenic process.

For the Fulmar Gas Pipeline, a gas de-sulphurisation plant is used to remove hydrogen sulphide and reduce the water content.

Security
To prevent terrorism the site is protected 24 hours a day by armed police guards

Shell gas fields

Bittern
Discovered in June 1996 with production starting in April 2000. Mostly an oil field. Gas transported via the Fulmar Gas Pipeline.

Brent
Mostly an oil field. Discovered in July 1971, with production starting in November 1976. Very large gas field. Gas transported via the FLAGS pipeline.

Curlew D
Discovered in May 1990, with production starting in November 1997. Mainly an oil field, with the associated Curlew B field. Named after the Curlew bird. Gas transported via the Fulmar Gas Pipeline.

Fulmar
Named after the Fulmar bird. Discovered in December 1975, with production starting in February 1982. Gives its name to the Fulmar Gas Pipeline. Mainly an oil field. Currently operated by Repsol Sinopec.

Goldeneye
Discovered in September 1996. Unmanned platform.

Nelson
Originally operated by Enterprise Oil, and mainly an oil field. Discovered in March 1988, with production starting in February 1994. Gas transported via Kittiwake and through the Fulmar Gas Pipeline.

Total gas fields

Alwyn North
Also an oil field. Discovered in October 1975, with production starting in December 1987. Gas transported via Frigg pipeline.

Dunbar
Also an oil field. Discovered November 1973, with production starting in December 1994. Gas transported via Frigg pipeline.

Ellon
Discovered in October 1973, with production starting in December 1994. Gas transported via Alwyn and the Frigg pipeline.

Grant
Discovered in August 1977 with production starting in July 1998. Gas transported via Dunbar and Alwyn and then the Frigg pipeline.

Nuggets
Discovered in July 1994. Production started in 2002. Full name is the Northern Underwater Gas Gathering Export and Treatment System.

Apache gas fields

Beryl
Beryl A (alpha) was discovered in September 1972, and Beryl B (bravo) in May 1975. Production began for Beryl A in June 1976, and for Beryl B in July 1984. Gas is transported via the SAGE pipeline.

Skene
Also an oil field. Discovered in 1976, with production starting in February 2002. Also an oil field. Named after the Clan Skene. Gas transported via the SAGE pipeline.

BP gas fields

Bruce
Discovered in July 1974 with production starting in August 1993. Also an oil field. Gas transported via the Frigg pipeline. Large gas field.

Magnus
Also an oil field. Discovered in July 1974, with production beginning in August 1983. Gas transported via the FLAGS and Northern Leg pipelines.

Miller
Also an oil field. Discovered March 1983, with production starting in June 1992. Gas transported eventually to Peterhead power station at Boddam via the Miller Transportation System which goes to the Total terminal. Ceased production in 2007.

ConocoPhillips gas fields

Britannia
Discovered in September 1975, with production starting in August 1998. Operated by ConocoPhillips. Pipeline to SAGE Terminal at St Fergus. This field was originally licensed to Britannia Oil Company Ltd, it was formerly named Bosun after the Bosun sandstone trend. Chevron was the operator of Block 16/26 which they named Kilda, and Conoco operated the neighbouring Block 15/30 named Lapworth. They eventually realised the field encompassed all these finds and it was renamed Britannia because of its scale.

Statoil gas fields
Operated by the Norwegian Statoil company.

Statfjord
Originally operated by Mobil. Discovered in February 1975, with production starting in November 1979. Gas transported by the FLAGS system, and also some to Kårstø in Norway. Also an oil field.

Canadian Natural Resources gas fields

Kyle
Also an oil field. Operated by Canadian Natural Resources Limited, trading as CNR International (UK) Ltd. Discovered in August 1993, with production beginning in March 2001.

Petro-Canada gas fields

Guillemot West & Guillemot Northwest
Guillemot West discovered in October 1979 and Guillemot Northwest discovered in July 1985. Production started in April 2000. Operated by Petro-Canada, although previously operated by Veba Oil. Gas transported via the Frigg system (FGL).

Britannia Operator Ltd gas fields

Britannia
Owned mostly by Chevron and ConocoPhillips. Discovered in September 1975 with production starting in August 1998. Gas transported via the SAGE pipeline. Very large gas field.

Marathon gas fields
Operated by Marathon Oil.

Beinn
Discovered in November 1989 with production starting in February 1994. Beinn means mountain in Gaelic. Also an oil field. Gas transported via the SAGE pipeline.

Brae
Mainly an oil field. Discovered from 1975-7, with production starting in 1983 and 1988-9. Gas transported via the SAGE pipeline. Brae is also Gaelic for hill.

Talisman gas fields
These fields are operated by Talisman Energy.

Galley
Discovered in October 1974 with production starting in March 1998. Also an oil field. Gas transported via the Tartan platform and the Frigg pipeline.

Orion
Discovered in September 1971 with production starting in September 1999. also an oil field, with gas transported via the Fulmar Gas Pipeline.

Piper
Discovered in January 1973 with production starting in December 1976. Mostly an oil field. Gas transported via the Frigg pipeline.

Tartan
Discovered in January 1975, with production starting in January 1981. Gas transported via the Frigg pipeline. Mainly an oil field.

Canadian Natural Resources International (CNRi)

Strathspey
Originally operated by Texaco. Discovered in March 1975, with production starting in December 1993. Gas transported via the FLAGS pipeline.

See also
 Easington Gas Terminal
 Bacton Gas Terminal
 Lindsey Oil Refinery (owned by Total)

References

External links
 Gazetteer for Scotland
 Goldeneye Gas Platform
 TOTAL Frigg Pipeline and UK Terminal
 TOTAL
 Aberdeen University exhibition
 Total Powerpoint presentation
 History of the Shell plant
 ExxonMobil
 SAGE pipeline

Gas fields
 Alwyn North
 Beryl
 Britannia
 Bruce
 Curlew
 Dunbar
 Dunbar/Ellon
 Forvie/Grant
 Goldeneye
 Magnus
 NUGGETS
 Nuggets
 Otter

News items
 Investment by Shell in April 2007

North Sea energy
Natural gas plants
Natural gas terminals
Oil and gas industry in Scotland
TotalEnergies
Shell plc buildings and structures
ExxonMobil buildings and structures
Natural gas infrastructure in the United Kingdom
Buildings and structures in Aberdeenshire
Buildings and structures completed in 1978
Environment of Aberdeenshire